Cyclostrema charmophron is a species of sea snail, a marine gastropod mollusk in the family Liotiidae.

Distribution
This species occurs in the Persian Gulf.

References

External links
 To World Register of Marine Species

charmophron
Gastropods described in 1906